Sorn Inthor is a Cambodian politician. He belongs to the Cambodian People's Party and was elected to represent Stung Treng Province in the National Assembly of Cambodia in 2003.

References

Members of the National Assembly (Cambodia)
Living people
Year of birth missing (living people)
Cambodian People's Party politicians